Raymond David Flood (21 November 1935 – 13 March 2014) was an English cricketer active in the late 1950s and beginning of the 1960s. A right-handed batsman who bowled right-arm off break, Flood made over twenty appearances in first-class cricket.

Career and life
Flood made his first-class debut for Hampshire against Essex at the United Services Recreation Ground during the 1956 County Championship, one of two first-class matches he played that season. He did not feature for Hampshire in 1957, while in 1958 he played just once against Derbyshire. Flood found his first–team appearances limited with the established presence of Roy Marshall, Jimmy Gray and Henry Horton limited his appearances, in what was a strong Hampshire side for the time.

He made his breakthrough into the Hampshire first-team in 1959, making twenty first-class appearances in a season characterised by good weather and an early experiment with covered wickets. He scored 780 runs in 1959, averaging 25.16 and scoring his only first-class century, scoring an unbeaten 138 against Sussex at Hove. With the emergence of Dennis Baldry, Danny Livingstone and Mike Barnard's move from The Football League to playing for Hampshire on a full-time basis, Flood's career did not survive much longer, with one appearance in 1960 against Oxford University. After a serious knee injury, he was released by Hampshire prior to the 1961 season. 

His batting strengths were described by John Arlott in 1959 Cricket Journal, with Arlott remarking "His strength lies in two strokes... a truly bucolic swing to, or over, mid-wicket and the archaic square-cut off the front foot”. Following his retirement from first-class cricket, Flood lived in the New Forest, working as a window cleaner and playing club cricket for Lyndhurst, Hampshire. He was diagnosed with liver cancer in 2013 and died six months later on 13 March 2014 in Lyndhurst. His brother John was a footballer who played 129 matches for Southampton.

References

External links
Raymond Flood at ESPNcricinfo
Raymond Flood at CricketArchive

1935 births
2014 deaths
Cricketers from Southampton
English cricketers
Hampshire cricketers
Deaths from cancer in England
Deaths from liver cancer